Orange County Courthouse  or Old Orange County Courthouse may refer to:

Old Orange County Courthouse (California), Santa Ana, California
Orange County Courthouse (Florida), Orlando, Florida
Old Orange County Courthouse (Florida), Orlando, Florida
Orange County Courthouse (Indiana), Paoli, Indiana
Old Orange County Courthouse (North Carolina), Hillsborough, North Carolina
Orange County Courthouse (Texas), Orange, Texas
Orange County Courthouse (Virginia), Orange, Virginia